The Ennis Baronetcy, of Ballinahown Court in the County of Westmeath, was a title in the Baronetage of the United Kingdom. It was created on 27 July 1866 for John Ennis, Member of Parliament for Athlone from 1857 to 1865. The second Baronet was also Member of Parliament for Athlone. The title became extinct on his death in 1884.

Ennis baronets, of Ballinahown Court (1866)
Sir John Ennis, 1st Baronet (1800–1878)
Sir John James Ennis, 2nd Baronet (1842–1884)

References 

Extinct baronetcies in the Baronetage of the United Kingdom
Athlone
1866 establishments in the United Kingdom